Saint Brecan was an Irish saint active in the 5th century AD.  There are legends concerning Brecan from Clare and Aran, and wells and churches are dedicated to him in various places in Ireland. His main monument is the Tempull Breccain complex on Inishmore in the Aran Islands.

Life and legends

Brecan is the oldest of all the local saints of County Clare, and lived around 480 AD.
He was grandchild of Carthan Fionn, one of the Dalcassian kings who reigned in Munster around 439 AD. His grandfather was baptized by Saint Patrick at what is now Singland, near Limerick. His father, son of the king, was Eochu Balldearg, or Eochu of the Red Spot.
It was recorded that Eochu was hopelessly disfigured and diseased when he was born, but was cured through a miracle by Saint Patrick.
Brecan was one of two sons of Eochaidh Bailldearg, the other being Conall Caemh, and was originally named Breasel.
A poem from the 14th or 15th century says he was a soldier before becoming a missionary. 
On his first mission to Aran he destroyed a reigning idol named Brecán, and took that name for himself.
He converted the idol's sanctuary into a hermitage.

According to the antiquarian Thomas Johnson Westropp, 

A different version of the dispute between Saints Enda and Brecan is recorded by Roderic O'Flaherty:

Saint Brecan died early in the 6th century.

Legacy

Saint Brecan's most important foundations were the Seven Churches of Aran on Inishmore, of which only the ruins of two have survived.
Brecan's church is the chief of the Seven Churches.
The Tempull Breccain (Church of Brecan) on Aran was described in 1684 as a handsome and formerly parochial church in which Brecan's feast was celebrated on 22 May each year.
The Damhliag or great Church of Saint Brecan consists of a nave and a choir connected by a beautiful semi-circular arch of cut stone.
The original layout was a rectangle with projections of the north and south walls beyond the east and west gables. 
It probably had an entrance doorway in the south wall, which suggests it was built in the 12th century or later.
The building was remodeled in the 13th century when the chancel and arch were added.

Brecan's tomb is beside the main church.
The Leaba Brecain is an early enclosure that holds a broken but richly carved cross, and contains a slab inscribed with a cross and "[S]ci Brecani".
This shows that he was revered as a saint from an early date.
A smaller circular stone found in the tomb, about three inches in diameter, was inscribed with the short prayer in Irish: "OR AR BRAN NAILITHER", which may be short for "OROIT AR BRECAN NAILITHER", meaning "A prayer for Brecan the Pilgrim".
However, the stone may well have been placed by a pilgrim named Bran.

Brecan is said to have founded many other churches and monasteries. These include Ardbraccan in County Meath, Kilbreccan in the parish of Kilcummin, County Galway, Kilbreccan of Thomand in the parish of Doora, County Clare, Kilbreccan in Kilkenny, and two churches named Kilbreccan in Carlow.
Doora Church near Kilbrecan, Doora parish would have been one of the first central mission churches in Clare if the tradition that it was founded by Brecan is accurate.
The modern St. Brecan's Church, Doora, on Noughaval Drive in Noughaval townland, also bears his name.
Brecan's name is remembered as "Rikin" at Clooney near Quin, and as "Brecan" at Kilbreckan in Doora parish and at the Toomullin well near the Moher cliffs. A well at Doolin, near Toomullin, was known as St. Brecan's in 1839.

St. Columb's Park in Derry has the ruins of a small church of Saint Brecan's.
The original church was destroyed in 1197 by a Rotsel Pitun, a Norman knight.
It is mentioned in a text from 1397.
The ruins are those of a successor church built in 1585 in the same location by Redmond O'Gallagher, Bishop of Derry.
The old church of Saint Brecan is one of the old standing Christian foundations in the city.
According to Monsignor Eamon Martin, administrator of the Derry diocese, it is more than 1,500 years old.

References

Sources

Medieval Irish saints
5th-century births
6th-century deaths
5th-century Irish priests
6th-century Irish priests